Pete Candoli (born Walter Joseph Candoli; June 28, 1923 – January 11, 2008) was an American jazz trumpeter. He played with the big bands of Woody Herman and Stan Kenton and worked in the studios of the recording and television industries.

Career
A native of Mishawaka, Indiana, Pete Candoli was the older brother of Conte Candoli.

During the 1940s he was a member of big bands led by Sonny Dunham, Will Bradley, Ray McKinley, Tommy Dorsey, Teddy Powell, Woody Herman, Boyd Raeburn, Tex Beneke, and Jerry Gray. For his ability to hit high notes on the trumpet he was given the nickname "Superman". While he was a member of Woody Herman's First Herd, he sometimes wore a Superman costume during his solo. In the 1950s he belonged to the bands of Stan Kenton and Les Brown and in Los Angeles began to work as a studio musician. His studio work included recording soundtracks for the movies Bell, Book and Candle, Private Hell 36, Day the World Ended, (1955), ('The S.F. Blues'), Peter Gunn, (on 38 epidodes, acting once), Save the Tiger, The Man with the Golden Arm, and The Prisoner of Second Avenue; appearing with The Tonight Show Band ;and acting in The Adventures of Ozzie and Harriet, (1957); Kings Go Forth, (1958); Touch of Evil, (1958); 'Pete', in three episodes of Johnny Staccato,  (1958-'59); Porgy and Bess (film), (1959); as trumpet player 'Johnny', in 'The Hand', an episode of Alcoa Presents: One Step Beyond, (series 2, episode 15), 1959, (broadcast US, 15th. Dec); as the 'Spokesman', in one episode of The Untouchables (1959 TV series), (1959-'63); Monsanto Night Presents Michel Legrand, a 1972 tv. special, in which he played 'Mos Santos'; a bartender and trumpet player in the short film, 'Tarzana', (1978), (starring his then wife, Edie Adams); and as 'Sam Johnson', in one episode of Hotel (American TV series), (1983), among others. 

Pete Candoli and his brother Conte formed a band that performed in the late 1950s and early 1960s and intermittently from the 1970s to the 1990s. In the early 1970s he performed in nightclubs with his second wife, singer Edie Adams. Heart surgery delayed his career at the end of the 1970s, but he returned to performing at musical festivals and with Lionel Hampton. He reunited with the Woody Herman band for its fifty-and sixty-year anniversary concerts.

Candoli was featured on the cartoon series The Ant and the Aardvark, which used a jazz score for its theme and musical cues.

Candoli died of complications from prostate cancer on January 11, 2008, at the age of 84. Conte Candoli died of the same disease in 2001.

Awards and honors
 International Jazz Hall of Fame, 1997
 Big Band Hall of Fame, 2003
 Look magazine named him one of the seven all-time outstanding jazz trumpet players.

Discography

As leader
 For Peter's Sake (Kapp, 1960)
 Blues, When Your Lover Has Gone (Somerset/Stereo-Fidelity, 1961)
 Moscow Mule and Many More Kicks (Decca, 1966)
 From the Top (Dobre, 1978)
 Live at the Royal Palms Inn Vol. 9 with Bill Perkins, Carl Fontana (Woofy, 1994)

With Conte Candoli
 The Brothers Candoli (Dot, 1957)
 Bell, Book, and Candoli  (Dot, 1959)
 2 for the Money (Mercury, 1959)
 There Is Nothing Like a Dame (Warner Bros., 1962)
 Candoli Brothers (Dobre, 1978)
 Two Brothers (Hindsight 1999)

As sideman
With Glen Gray
 Sounds of the Great Bands! (Capitol 1958)
 Sounds of the Great Bands Volume 2 (Capitol, 1959)
 Solo Spotlight (Capitol, 1960)
 Please Mr. Gray (Capitol, 1961)
 Themes of the Great Bands (Capitol, 1963)

With Woody Herman
 Woody Herman and the Herd at Carnegie Hall (Lion, 1958)
 The Thundering Herds (Columbia, 1961)
 The First Herd at Carnegie Hall (VSP, 1966)
 Live at Carnegie Hall (VSP, 1966)
 The Turning Point 1943–1944 (Coral, 1969)

With Stan Kenton
 Popular Favorites by Stan Kenton (Capitol, 1953)
 This Modern World (Capitol, 1953)
 Kenton in Hi-Fi (Capitol, 1956)
 By Request (Creative World, 1971)
 By Request Volume II (Creative World, 1972)

With Peggy Lee
 Black Coffee (Decca, 1956)
 Things Are Swingin'  (Capitol, 1958)
 Blues Cross Country (Capitol, 1962)

With Henry Mancini
 The Music from Peter Gunn (RCA, 1959)
 More Music from Peter Gunn (RCA Victor, 1959)
 The Blues and the Beat (RCA Victor, 1960)
 Combo! (RCA Victor, 1961)
 Uniquely Mancini (RCA Victor, 1963)
 The Concert Sound of Henry Mancini (RCA Victor, 1964)
 Henry Mancini's Golden Album (RCA Victor, 1966)
 Gunn...Number One!: Music from the Film Score (RCA Victor, 1967)
 Mancini '67 (RCA Victor, 1967)
 Mancini Concert (RCA Victor, 1971)

With Skip Martin
 The Music from Mickey Spillane's Mike Hammer (RCA Victor, 1959)
 8 Brass, 5 Sax, 4 Rhythm (MGM, 1959)
 Scheherajazz (Somerset, 1959)
 Swingin' with Prince Igor (Sonic Workshop, 1960)
 Songs and Sounds from the Era of the Untouchables (Somerset, 1960)
 Perspectives in Percussion: Volume 2 (Somerset/Stereo-Fidelity, 1961)
 Swingin' Things from Can-Can (Somerset, 1961)
With Ted Nash
Peter Gunn (Crown, 1959)
With Shorty Rogers
 Cool and Crazy (RCA Victor, 1953)
 Shorty Rogers Courts the Count (RCA Victor, 1954)
 The Big Shorty Rogers Express (RCA Victor, 1956)
 Martians Come Back! (Atlantic, 1956)
 Way Up There (Atlantic, 1957)
 Shorty Rogers Plays Richard Rodgers (RCA Victor, 1957)
 Portrait of Shorty (RCA Victor, 1958)
 Chances Are It Swings (RCA Victor, 1959)
 The Wizard of Oz and Other Harold Arlen Songs (RCA Victor, 1959)

With Pete Rugolo
 Introducing Pete Rugolo (Columbia, 1954)
 Adventures in Rhythm (Columbia, 1954)
 Rugolomania (Columbia, 1955)
 Music for Hi-Fi Bugs (EmArcy, 1956)
 New Sounds by Pete Rugolo (Harmony, 1957)
 Out on a Limb (EmArcy, 1957)
 An Adventure in Sound: Brass in Hi-Fi (Mercury, 1957)
 The Music from Richard Diamond (EmArcy, 1959)
 Behind Brigitte Bardot (Warner Bros., 1960)
 Ten Trumpets and 2 Guitars (Mercury, 1961)

With others
 Ray Anthony, Ray Anthony Plays Steve Allen (Capitol, 1958)
 Charlie Barnet, Big Band 1967 Mobile Fidelity (Creative World, 1986)
 Count Basie, Compositions of Count Basie and Others (Crown, 1959)
 Louie Bellson, Their Time Was the Greatest! (Concord Jazz, 1996)
 Irving Berlin, The Complete Irving Berlin Songbooks (Verve, 1997)
 Milt Bernhart, Modern Brass (RCA Victor, 1955)
 Milt Bernhart, The Sound of Bernhart (Decca, 1958)
 Elmer Bernstein, The Man with the Golden Arm  (Decca, 1956)
 Elmer Bernstein, Sweet Smell of Success (Decca, 1957)
 Buddy Bregman, Swinging Kicks (Verve, 1957)
 Ray Brown, Bass Hit! (Verve, 1957)
 Sonny Burke, The Uncollected Sonny Burke and His Orchestra 1951 (Hindsight, 1981)
 Benny Carter, Aspects (United Artists, 1959)
 Benny Carter, The Benny Carter Jazz Calendar (United Artists, 1959)
 Rosemary Clooney, Clap Hands! Here Comes Rosie! (RCA Victor, 1960)
 Albert Collins, There's Gotta Be a Change (Tumbleweed, 1971)
 Bob Cooper, Coop! (Contemporary, 1958)
 Alexander Courage, Hot Rod Rumble (Liberty, 1957)
 Peggy Connelly, Peggy Connelly (Bethlehem, 1956)
 Joao Donato, A Bad Donato (Blue Thumb, 1970)
 The Doobie Brothers, I Cheat the Hangman (Warner Bros., 1975)
 The Doobie Brothers, Stampede (Warner Bros., 1975)
 Tommy Dorsey, One Night Stand (Sandy Hook, 1976)
 George Duning, Bell, Book and Candle (Colpix, 1958)
 Billy Eckstine, Billy Eckstine's Imagination (Mercury, 1959)
 Dennis Farnon, Caution! Men Swinging (RCA Victor, 1957)
 Ella Fitzgerald, Ella Fitzgerald  Sings the Cole Porter Song Book (Verve, 1956)
 Ella Fitzgerald, Ella Fitzgerald Sings the Rodgers and Hart Song Book (Verve, 1956)
 Dominic Frontiere, On Any Sunday (Bell, 1971)
 Russell Garcia, Wigville (Bethlehem, 1955)
 Mitzi Gaynor, Sings the Lyrics of Ira Gershwin (LPTime, 2009)
 John Graas, John Graas! (Mercury, 1958)
 Jerry Gray, The Uncollected 1949–50 (Hindsight, 1985)
 Lionel Hampton, Aurex Jazz Festival '81 (EastWorld, 1981)
 Lionel Hampton, Ambassador at Large (Glad-Hamp, 1990)
 Al Hibbler, Sings the Blues Monday Every Day (Reprise, 1961)
 Lena Horne, Lovely and Alive (Fresh Sound/RCA Victor, 1985)
 Neal Hefti, Jazz Pops (Reprise, 1962)
 Quincy Jones, Go West Man! (ABC-Paramount, 1957)
 Fred Katz, Folk Songs for Far Out Folk (Warner Bros., 1959)
 Fred Katz, Fred Katz and his Jammers (Decca, 1960)
 Frankie Laine, Rockin'  (Columbia, 1957)
 Vicky Lane, I Swing for You (LPTime, 2010)
 Jimmie Lunceford, Swing Goes On! Vol.7 (EMI/Electrola, 1978)
 Billy May, Billy May's Big Fat Brass (Capitol, 1958)
 Billy May, The Girls and Boys On Broadway (Capitol, 1983)
 Junior Mance, Get Ready, Set, Jump!!! (Capitol, 1964)
 Junior Mance, Straight Ahead! (Capitol, 1965)
 Gerry Mulligan, Walking Shoes (Capitol, 1972)
 Gerry Mulligan, Gene Norman Presents the Original Gerry Mulligan Tentet and Quartet (GNP, 1997)
 Mark Murphy, Mark Murphy's Hip Parade (Capitol, 1960)
 Ted Nash, Peter Gunn (Crown, 1959)
 Anita O'Day, Pick Yourself Up with Anita O'Day (Verve, 1990)
 Anita O'Day and Billy May, Swing Rodgers and Hart (Verve, 2004)
 Patti Page, In the Land of Hi-Fi (Mercury, 1959)
 Marty Paich, The Picasso of Big Band Jazz (Discovery, 1982)
 Art Pepper, Art Pepper + Eleven (Contemporary, 1959)
 Jane Powell, Can't We Be Friends? (LPTime, 2009)
 Frankie Randall, Sings & Swings (RCA Victor, 1965)
 Buddy Rich, This One's for Basie (Norgran, 1956)
 Johnny Richards, Something Else by Johnny Richards (Bethlehem, 1956)
 Nelson Riddle, (Contemporary, Sound of Nelson Riddle (United Artists, 1968)
 Annie Ross and Buddy Bregman, Gypsy (Pacific Jazz, 1995)
 Jimmy Rowles, Let's Get Acquainted with Jazz ...for People Who Hate Jazz! (Tampa, 1959)
 Howard Rumsey, Jazz Rolls Royce (Lighthouse, 1958)
 Tak Shindo, Brass and Bamboo (Capitol, 1960)
 Bobby Short, Bobby Short (Atlantic, 1956)
 Dan Terry, The Complete Vita Recordings of Dan Terry
 Mel Torme, Mel Torme Sings Fred Astaire (Bethlehem, 1956)
 Mel Torme, Mel Torme with the Marty Paich Dek-Tette (Bethlehem, 1956)
 Mel Torme, Mel Torme's California Suite (Avenue Jazz, 1999)
 Bobby Troup, Bobby Troup and His Stars of Jazz (RCA Victor, 1959)
 Franz Waxman, Crime in the Streets (Decca, 1956)
 Stanley Wilson, The Music from M Squad (RCA Victor, 1959)

References

External links
AllAboutJazz.com

1923 births
2008 deaths
Musicians from Indiana
People from Mishawaka, Indiana
20th-century American musicians
20th-century trumpeters
American jazz trumpeters
American male trumpeters
Bebop trumpeters
Burials at Forest Lawn Memorial Park (Hollywood Hills)
Cool jazz trumpeters
Deaths from prostate cancer
American male jazz musicians
Swing trumpeters
The Tonight Show Band members
West Coast jazz trumpeters
20th-century American male musicians
Deaths from cancer in California